The 1965 All England Championships was a badminton tournament held at Wembley Arena, London, England, from 24 to 28 March 1965.

Lee Kin Tat represented Singapore following their independence, having previously represented Malaysia. The former Ulla Rasmussen was now competing under her married name of Ulla Strand.

Final results

Men's singles

Section 1

Section 2

Women's singles

Section 1

Section 2

References

All England Open Badminton Championships
All England Badminton Championships
All England Open Badminton Championships in London
All England Badminton Championships
All England Badminton Championships
All England Badminton Championships